Allan Shanks Lindsay (5 March 1926 – 2 April 2014) was a British athlete. He competed in the men's triple jump at the 1948 Summer Olympics.

References

External links
 

1926 births
2014 deaths
Athletes (track and field) at the 1948 Summer Olympics
British male triple jumpers
Olympic athletes of Great Britain
Scottish male athletes
Scottish triple jumpers
Athletes (track and field) at the 1950 British Empire Games
Commonwealth Games competitors for Scotland
Sportspeople from Shotts